Neville Featherstone-Griffin (17 December 1933 – 17 December 2014) was an English cricketer. Griffin was a right-handed batsman who bowled right-arm medium pace. He was born in Croydon, Surrey.

Featherstone-Griffin made a single first-class appearance for Surrey against Oxford University in 1963 at The Oval. Oxford University won the toss and elected to bat first, making 264 all out in their first-innings, during which Griffin bowled nine wicketless overs which conceded 34 runs. In Surrey's first-innings of 250/8 declared, Griffin was dismissed for 7 runs by John Cuthbertson. Oxford University then made 249/5 declared, with Griffin bowling a further seven wicketless overs which conceded 11 runs. Set 264 for victory, Surrey fell eight runs short in their chase ensuring the match ended in a draw. Griffin ended the innings not out on 83. This was his only major appearance for Surrey.

He died on 17 December 2014 on his 81st birthday.

References

External links
Neville Featherstone-Griffin at ESPNcricinfo
Neville Featnerstone Griffin at CricketArchive

1933 births
2014 deaths
English cricketers
People from Croydon
Surrey cricketers